Ancient and Horribles Parade, founded in 1926, is a nationally known Fourth of July parade on U.S. Route 44 (Putnam Pike) in the village of Chepachet, Rhode Island, in the town of Glocester. Parades of horribles were a New England tradition dating back prior to the 1870s or earlier in various small towns across New England.

History
The oldest known Ancient and Horribles Parade in New England occurred on July 4, 1851, in Lowell, Massachusetts and was named as a parody of the more somber Ancient and Honorable Artillery Company of Massachusetts, the oldest military organization in the United States. New Englanders in several cities started parading in concert with other New England towns in the middle of the 1800s in "Ancient and Horrible" or "Antique and Horribles" parades. The dress was meant to satirize politicians and other public figures. This had largely died out by 1900 in Vermont. Gloucester, Massachusetts, continues to have a "Horribles Parade" into the 21st century but without the satirical political dimension the costumes once held. 

Glocester Rhode Island's "Ancient and Horribles Parade" was founded in 1926 when Calvin Coolidge was U.S. President. Coolidge was a member of the original Ancient and Honorable Artillery Company in Boston. According to the 2008 chair of the parade, Connie Leathers, "...Rhode Islanders being Rhode Islanders made fun of them."  The Parade features both traditional Fourth of July  floats and marchers, such as veterans and fire trucks, as well as often irreverent, satirical displays commenting on political and cultural issues.

There was no parade in 1942–1945 nor 2020-2021.

See also
Ancient and Honorable Artillery Company of Massachusetts
Glocester, Rhode Island
Swamp Yankee

References

External links

Glocester Parade Registration information

Rhode Island culture
Parades in the United States
Glocester, Rhode Island
Tourist attractions in Providence County, Rhode Island
Festivals in Rhode Island
1927 establishments in Rhode Island
Festivals established in 1927
Independence Day (United States) festivals